The Lynton Convict Hiring Depot (1853–1857) was the first convict depot north of Fremantle, Western Australia. It was established on 22 May 1853 with the arrival of the 173 ton brigantine Leander, which transferred 60 ticket-of-leave convicts and Pensioner Guards (retired British soldiers) that had arrived at Fremantle on the Pyrenees on 1 May. The depot was closed by order of Governor Kennedy on 3 January 1857 due to the high cost to the government of its maintenance.

The staff of the depot included, for a time, Thomas Leonowens, the husband of Anna Leon Owens, who would later become prominent as the author of a memoir regarding her career as a governess to the royal family of Siam (Thailand). The Leonowens' son, Louis was born at Lynton.

Five Irish immigrant women from a "bride ship" are also known to have arrived in WA at Lynton.

By 1856 a store, bakery, depot, lockup, hospital, lime kiln and administration block had all been built but a lack of fresh vegetables had seen the convict population ravaged by scurvy. It was decided to close the settlement and the convicts were transferred with the officer in charge to Champion Bay in 1857. The transfer seems to have been due to the growing importance of the town of Geraldton, and the need for public works in the district.

Lynton remains the most intact example of a regional convict depot in Western Australia. Entered on the Register of the national estate and vested in the Northampton Shire Council, conservation works are in progress via the Northampton Historical Society.

References

Further reading
 Gibbs M.  &  I. Lilley  1993 Management Plan for the Lynton Convict Hiring Depot.  National Trust of Australia (W.A.) for the Australian Heritage Commission
 Interim database entry at Heritage Council of Western Australia
Toodyay Convict Hiring Depot (1851)
Toodyay Convict Hiring Depot (1852–1872)

Buildings and structures built by convicts in Western Australia
1853 establishments in Australia
Lynton, Western Australia
State Register of Heritage Places in the Shire of Northampton